Eaton Branch is a stream in St. Francois County in the U.S. state of Missouri. It is a tributary of the Big River.

Eaton Branch has the name of Jesse Eaton, original owner of the site.

See also
List of rivers of Missouri

References

Rivers of St. Francois County, Missouri
Rivers of Missouri